The 2004 Ukrainian Super Cup became the first edition of Ukrainian Super Cup, an annual football match contested by the winners of the previous season's Ukrainian Top League and Ukrainian Cup competitions.

The match was played at the Central Stadium "Chornomorets", Odessa, on 10 July 2004, and contested by league winner Dynamo Kyiv and cup winner Shakhtar Donetsk. Dynamo won on penalties 6–5 after the regular time ended in 1-1 draw.

Match

Details

Statistics

Post-match reactions
In an interview to the Czech News Agency (CTK) the newly acquired Jan Laštůvka stated that Shakhtar was dictating the game tempo.

The penalty kick from goalkeeper Oleksandr Shovkovskyi became the game winner. In an interview he stated that decision on taking the shot was his own initiative.

References

External links
 "Dynamo" – holder of the Ukrainian Super Cup! ("Динамо" - обладатель Суперкубка Украины!). UA-Football. 10 July 2004.
 Ukrainian Super Cup. "Dynamo" – "Shakhtar". Text broadcasting (Суперкубок Украины. "Динамо" - "Шахтер". Текстовая трансляция). UA-Football. 10 July 2014.

2004
2004–05 in Ukrainian football
FC Dynamo Kyiv matches
FC Shakhtar Donetsk matches
Sport in Odesa
Ukrainian Super Cup 2004